Ockie van Zyl may refer to:
 Ockie van Zyl (rugby union, born 1982), South African rugby union player
 Ockie van Zyl (rugby union, born 1991), South African rugby union player